Jagdish Bishnoi (born 20 May 1972) is an Indian javelin thrower. He competed at the 2000 Summer Olympics in Sydney, in the men's javelin throw.

References

1972 births
Living people
Indian male javelin throwers
Olympic athletes of India
Athletes (track and field) at the 2000 Summer Olympics
Place of birth missing (living people)
Athletes (track and field) at the 1998 Asian Games
Asian Games competitors for India